This is a list of cities in Saint-Pierre and Miquelon.  The communes are:

Miquelon-Langlade
Saint-Pierre

Historically L'Île-aux-Marins was a separate commune up until 1945 when it was annexed into the commune of Saint-Pierre.

Within each commune there are settlements:

Miquelon, Miquelon-Langlade
Saint-Pierre, Saint-Pierre

Saint-Pierre and Miquelon
Saint Pierre and Miquelon-related lists